This is a list of techniques practiced in the Shotokan style of karate.

Stances (Tachi Kata) 
 Heisoku Dachi: formal attention stance
 Musubi Dachi: informal attention stance, both heels touching and feet at 45° angle
 Heiko Dachi: parallel attention stance (e.g. in the kata Kanku Dai)
 Hachiji Dachi: outward feet stance
 Uchi Hachiji Dachi: inward feet stance; reverse of hachiji Dachi
 Iaigoshi Dachi: kneeling stance (e.g. in the kata Enpi)
 Fudo Dachi: rooted stance (e.g. in the kata Bassai Dai)
 Hangetsu Dachi: half-moon stance (e.g. in the kata Hangetsu)
 Kiba Dachi: horse stance/side stance (e.g. in the Tekki katas)
 Kokutsu Dachi: back stance (in almost all Shotokan katas; usually first learned in Heian Shodan)
 Kosa Dachi: cross-legged stance (e.g. in the kata Heian Yondan)
 Neko ashi Dachi: cat stance (e.g. in the kata Bassai Sho)
 Mitsurin Dachi: jungle stance
 Renoji Dachi: stance in which the feet form the shape of the Japanese katakana “レ” when seen from above, or relaxed stance (e.g. in the kata Kanku Dai)
 Teiji Dachi: t-stance
 Sanchin Dachi: hourglass stance (e.g. in the kata Sanchin)
 Katashi Dachi: crane-like stance (e.g. in the kata Enpi)
 Sagi Ashi Dachi: heron stance (e.g. in the kata Jitte)
 Gankaku Dachi: crane stance (e.g. in the kata Gankaku)
 Tsuru Ashi Dachi: hanging leg stance
 Zenkutsu Dachi: front stance 
 Yoi Dachi (usually called Yoi): basic stance/Ready position
Yoi Dachi is Heiko Dachi with the hands out in a ready position.
 Yama Dachi: mountain stance (e.g. in the kata Jitte)
 Sochin Dachi: high-low blocking rooted stance
 Shizen tai: natural stance

Preparatory positions 
 koshi gamae: hip preparatory position
 ryoken koshi gamae: double hip preparatory position (e.g. in the kata, Heian sandan)
 morote koko gamae: double handed preparatory position (e.g. in the kata, Enpi)

“Reception” techniques (Uke-waza)Blocks

Using the arms 
 age-uke: rising block
 empi uke: elbow block (e.g. in the kata, Heian sandan)
 gedan barai: sweeping low block
 gedan morote barai: double sweeping low block (usually while going into kiba Dachi)
 haiwan uke: square side block (e.g. in the kata, Heian nidan)
 gedan juji uke: downward x block
 jodan juji uke: upward x block
 kaisho age uke: open-palm rising block
 kaisho haiwan uke: knife-hand square side block (e.g. in the kata, Heian yondan)
 kaisho juji uke: open-palm x block (e.g. in the kata, Heian godan)
 kakiwake uke: floating x block (e.g. in the kata, Heian yondan)
 morote uke: double forearm block (e.g. in the kata, Heian sandan)
 nagashi uke: rising palm sweep block (e.g. in the kata, Tekki shodan)
 osae uke: palm block
 otoshi uke: dropping forearm block
 shuto age uke: rising knife-hand block
 shuto gedan barai: knife-hand sweeping low block
 shuto uke: knife hand block
 shuto mawashi uke (roundhouse block with knife-hand)
 soto uke (外受け): outside forearm block
 morote sukui uke: scooping block
 tate shuto uke: half knife-hand block
 Te osae uke: dropping palm block
 Uchi ude uke (内腕受け)/ uchi uke (内受け): inside forearm block
 Gyako uchi uke: reverse outside mid-level (e.g. in the kata, Heian nidan)
 Ude barai: reverse sweeping forearm block
 Heo Tsukami: hair grab (e.g. in the kata, Enpi)
 Ushiro gedan barai: back low sweeping block (e.g. in the kata, Enpi)
 Teisho uke: palm heel block
 Chudan soete uke: added hand inside block (e.g. in the kata, Bassai Dai)
 Tsuki uke: punching block
 Morote Tsukami uke: augmented grabbing/throwing block
 Mawashi uke: roundhouse or circle block (e.g. in the kata, Unsu)
 Haishu uke: backhand block (e.g. in the kata, Heian godan
 Kosa uke (also known as joge uke): cross block (e.g. in the kata, Heian sandan)
 Teisho awase uke: hands together block (e.g. in the kata, Gankaku)
 Zenwan uke: forearm block
 Gedan kaki uke: downward hook block
 Joge kaki uke: up & down hook block (e.g. in the kata, Enpi)
 manji uke: "manji (卍)"-shaped block

Using the legs 
 Ashikubi Kake Uke: hooking ankle block
 Mika Zuki Geri Uke: crescent kick block (e.g. in the kata, Heian sandan)
 Nami Ashi, a.k.a. Nami Gaeshi: leg snapping wave block (e.g. in the kata, Tekki shodan)
 Sokutei Osae Uke: pressing sole block
 Sokuto Osae Uke: pressing footedge block

Striking techniques (Uchi-waza) 
 Age Empi: Rising elbow strike
 Age Zuki: Rising Punch
 Choku Zuki: Straight punch
 Chudan Juki (originally,"tsuki"):  Mid-level punch
 Empi Uchi: Elbow strike
 Gyaku zuki: Reverse punch
 Haishu Uchi: Back hand strike
 Haito Uchi: Ridge hand strike
 Gyaku Haito: Reverse Ridge hand strike
 Otoshi Gyaku Haito: Dropping reverse Ridge hand strike
 Jodan Haito: Upward Ridge hand strike (e.g. in the kata, Unsu)
 Age Heito: Rising Ridge hand strike
 Heiko Zuki: Parallel or Double punch
 Hasami Zuki: Scissor strike
 Hasami Nakadaka Ken: Scissor Middle Finger strike (e.g. in the kata, Chinte)
 Jun Zuki or Oi-zuki: Step through punch
 Kagi Zuki: Hook punch
 Atama Shiri Uchi: Head-Butt strike
 Kizami Zuki or Maete: jabbing punch (like a 'jab')
 Mae Mawashi Empi Uchi: Augmented side elbow strike (e.g. in the kata, Heian yondan)
 Mawashi Empi: Hook elbow strike
 Atsuen Empi Uchi: Rolling elbow strike (e.g. in the kata Nijushiho)
 Sokumen Zuki: Double side punch (e.g. in the kata, Tekki shodan)
 Ippon Ken: One finger Punch/Strike
 Nakadaka Ken: Middle finger punch/strike
 Nihon Ken: Two finger punch/strike; eye strike (e.g. in the kata, Chinte)
 Hiraken: Four knuckle strike 
 Nukite: Spear-hand strike
 Ippon Nukite: 1 finger Spear-hand strike (e.g. in the kata, Unsu)
 Nihon Nukite: 2 finger Spear-hand strike
 Oi zuki: Stepping punch
 Sanbon Zuki: Triple punch (Age zuki, Gyaku Zuki, Choku Zuki)
 Shuto Uchi: Knifehand strike
 Shuto Yoko Ganmen Uchi (knife-hand strike to head)
 Shuto Sakotsu Uchikomi (driving knife-hand to sternum)
 Shuto Sakotsu Uchi (knife-hand strike to clavicle)
 Shuto Hizo Uchi (knife-hand strike to spleen)
 Shuto Jodan Uchi  (inside knife-hand to neck)
 Sokumen Empi Uchi: Augmented elbow strike (e.g. in the kata, Tekki shodan)
 Tate Zuki: Half reverse punch, with a vertical fist
 Amuba Tsukami: Arm-Bar hold
 Teisho Furi Uchi: Sideways palm-heel strike
 Teisho Uchi: Palm-heel strike
 Tate Teisho Uchi: Vertical, or Rising palm heel strike
 Tettsui: Hammer-fist strike
 Tettsui Hasami Uchi: Hammer-fist scissor strike
 Tettsui Yoko Uchi (bottom fist strike to side)
 Otoshi Uraken: Dropping Backfist in kosa Dachi (e.g. in the kata, Heian yondan)
 Uraken Uchi: Backfist strike
 Uraken Mawashi Uchi (backfist circular strike to the head)
 Uraken Sayu Ganmen Uchi (backfist strike to side)
 Uraken Hizo Uchi: backfist strike to spleen
 Ushiro Empi Ate: backwards elbow strike
 Ura Zuki: Close short punch, with inverted fist, similar in nature to an 'uppercut'
 Ushiro Empi: Back elbow strike
 Yama Zuki ("mountain punch"): Wide double fisted strike (e.g. in the kata, Bassai dai and Wankan)
 Awase Zuki: Narrow double fisted strike
 Yoko Empi: Side elbow strike
 Yoko Tettsui: Sideways hammer-fist strike (e.g. in the kata, Heian nidan)
 Gyaku Age Zuki: Rising reverse punch (e.g. in the kata, Enpi)
 Tsukiage: Uppercut (e.g. in the kata, Heian godan)
 Kumate: Bear Claw, or Tiger Claw strike
 Seiryuto: Ox-Jaw Strike
 Heiko Seiryuto: Parallel or double Ox-Jaw Strike (e.g. in the kata, Gojushiho Sho)
 Kokuto: crane head strike
 Washite: Eagle hand or, eagle claw strike (e.g. in the kata, Gojushiho Dai)
 Keito: Chicken head strike
 Age Keito: Rising Chicken head strike
 Yumi Zuki: Bow drawing strike (e.g. in the kata, Sochin)

Kicking techniques (Keri-waza) 
 Ashi barai: Foot sweep
 Fumikomi Geri: Stomp kick
 Hiza geri: Knee strike
 Kin geri: Kick in the groin, performed like front kick but with the feet
 Mae-ashi geri: Front kick with front leg
 Mae-ashi mawashi geri: Front roundhouse kick with front leg
 Mae geri: Front kick
 Mae Hiza geri: Front knee kick
 Mae-ren geri: Double front kick (= double mae geri)
 Tobi mae geri: Front flying/jump kick
 Tobi yoko geri: Jumping side kick
 Tobi mawashi geri: Jumping roundhouse kick
 Tobi mikazuki geri: Jumping crescent kick
 Tobi gyaku mikazuki geri: Jumping reverse crescent
 Spin tobi ushiro geri: Jumping spinning back kick
 Tobi ushiro kagi geri: Jumping spinning hook kick
 Tobi hiza geri: Jumping knee kick
 Oi Mae Geri: Lunging rear-leg front kick
 Mawashi geri: Round kick
 Mawashi hiza geri: Circular knee kick
 Mikazuki geri: Crescent kick
 Gyaku mikazuki geri: Reverse Crescent kick
 Nidan tobi geri: Jumping Double front kick
 Ura mawashi geri or Kagi geri: Upper inside round kick, a.k.a. hook kick
 Ushiro geri: Back kick
 Ushiro mawashi geri : spinning hook kick
 Ushiro kekomi: Back side thrust kick
 Otoshi Mawashi Geri: Circular falling kick
 Yoko geri keage: Side snap kick
 Yoko geri kekomi: Side thrust kick
 Yoko tobi geri: Jumping side kick
 Ono Geri: Axe Kick
 Yoni Tsokia: Ducking leg hook
Ushiro Hiza Geri : back spinning knee strike
Otshi Hiza Geri : circular falling knee strike
Kakato Geri :kick with heels to jaw
Ura kakato geri: upper inside roundhouse heel kick
Otoshi kakato geri: circular falling heel kick to head or spine
 Hasu geri: lotus kick, or reverse roundhouse kick
 Kakudo geri: Angle kick

See also 
 List of Shotokan organizations
 Shotokan
 Passai

References 

Techniques
 
Karate-related lists